A Buddha bowl is a vegetarian meal, served on a single bowl or high-rimmed plate, which consists of small portions of several foods, served cold. These may include whole grains such as quinoa or brown rice, plant proteins such as chickpeas or tofu, and vegetables. The portions are not mixed on the plate or in the bowl, but arranged in an "artful" way. The concept appeared in 2013 (Juice for Life (now Fresh), in Toronto, Ontario, was offering this on their menu prior to 2013, and a recipe for a Buddha Bowl is in their cookbook dated to 2000, featuring recipes from the 1990s) and has grown popular since early 2017. Buddha bowls have been compared to Nourish Bowls (a non-vegetarian version) and to Poké Bowls (a Hawaiian raw fish dish).

There are several explanations for why the name refers to Buddha. It may originate from presenting a balanced meal, where balance is a key Buddhist concept, from the story of Buddha carrying his food bowl to fill it with whatever bits of food villagers would offer him, to the explanation of the overstuffed bowl resembling the belly of Budai, a 10th-century Chinese monk often confused with Buddha.

See also

 Poke (Hawaiian dish)
 Sam Choy
 Cuisine of Hawaii
 Crudo
 Hoe 
 List of hors d'oeuvre
 List of raw fish dishes
 List of salads
 'Ota 'ika
 Tataki
 Singju
 Yusheng

References

Vegan cuisine
Vegetarian cuisine
Salads